The Australian Sports Commission (ASC) is the Australian Government commission responsible for supporting and investing in sport in Australia. The Commission incorporates the Australian Institute of Sport. From 2018 to 2022, it was known as Sport Australia. 

Although it is commonly believed that the Australian Government's initial involvement in sports was prompted by the country's poor performance at the 1976 Montreal Olympic Games in which Australia failed to win a gold medal, the Government actually began initial investigations into its potential role in sports in 1973. It was at this time that the Government commissioned professor John Bloomfield to prepare a sports plan for the country. His report, "The Role, Scope and Development of Recreation in Australia", was based on studies of sports institutes in Europe and their success in developing elite athletes. Bloomfield suggested to the Government that it should establish a national institute of sport similar to those operating in European countries.

Following receipt of the report, the Minister for Tourism and Recreation, Frank Stewart, appointed a study group (chaired by Dr Allan Coles) to report on the feasibility of establishing a sports institute in Australia. The Coles Report was released in 1975 and recommended the establishment of the institute.

Although the recommendation to establish the institute was made in 1975, it was not until 1981 that the institute was established. The delay in establishing the institute is commonly considered to be a combination of poor support for Australian sport following the 1976 Montreal Olympics and the uneasiness between the Australian Olympic Federation (now the Australian Olympic Committee) and the Government. This uneasiness was caused over the Federation ignoring the Government's request to boycott the 1980 Moscow Olympic Games because of Russia's invasion of Afghanistan.

The Bloomfield and Coles reports, however, were not lost on Bob Ellicott, the Minister for Home Affairs and Environment. Buoyed by the concept of a national sports institute during a trip to China and keen to bridge the gap between government and sport, in 1980 Ellicott and his staff offered the Coles Report as a model plan for Australia. The plan would allow athletes to train and develop in Australia rather than be forced overseas. Ellicott's vision was well received and on Australia Day, 26 January 1981, the AIS was officially opened by Prime Minister Malcolm Fraser. Renowned swim coach, Don Talbot was appointed as the Institute's first Director. With the Institute established, the Commonwealth Government had begun its significant involvement in Australian sport.

The Australian Labor Party in its 1983 election sport policy recommended the establishment of a sports commission to provide a more co-ordinated approach to sport. In 1984, an Interim Committee report recommended its establishment. The Australian Sports Commission was formally established by the Australian Sports Commission Act 1985. In August 1987, the Australian Government formalised their decision to rationalise federal assistance to Australian sport and the Australian Institute of Sport merged with the Australian Sports Commission, which was to be the agency responsible for general sports participation as well as high performance sport.

Since its establishment, the ASC has implemented several major Australian Government sports policies:
 1989 – Australian Sports Kit
 1992 – Maintain the Momentum
 1994 – Olympic Athlete Program
 2001 – Backing Australia's Sporting Ability
 2010 – Australian Sport: the Pathway to Success
 2012 – Australia's Winning Edge
 2018 – Sport 2030 – National Sport Plan

Administration

The ASC is a statutory authority of the Australian Government, that is governed by a board of Commissioners appointed by the Minister for Sport. The ASC's roles and responsibilities are prescribed in the  Australian Sports Commission Act 1989.

The ASC attempts to promote an effective national sports system that offers improved participation in quality sports by all Australians. In addition, the ASC helps those who are talented and motivated to reach their potential excellence in sports performance. The ASC achieves these objectives by administering and funding national sporting programs on behalf of the Government and providing leadership, co-ordination and support for the sport sector.

The ASC works closely with a range of national sporting organisations, state and local governments, schools and community organisations to ensure sport is well run and accessible so that everyone can participate and enjoy the benefits. The ASC supports participation in sport, from grass roots participation to participation at the elite level.

Chairman of the ASC Board
 Ted Harris 1984–1994
 Mike Fitzpatrick 1994–1997
 Peter Bartels 1997–2008
 Greg Hartung 2008–2010
 Warwick Smith 2010–2012
 John Wylie 2012–2020
 Josephine Sukkar 2021–
Chief executive officers
 Greg Hartung 1984–1988
 Ronald Harvey 1989
 Perry Crosswhite – acting (1988–1990)
 Jim Ferguson 1990–2000
 Mark Peters 2001-2008
 Matt Miller 2009-2011
 Simon Hollingsworth 2012–2016
Kate Palmer 2017–2020 
Kieren Perkins 2021-

Organisational structure
The organisational structure of the Australian Sports Commission has changed many times since its establishment as can be seen through its annual reports. The structure has generally represented the areas of high performance sport, sports participation, sport management and corporate/commercial services. The AIS has been an elite sport flagship program of the ASC since its merger in 1989.

Australian Institute of Sport

The Australian Institute of Sport (AIS) is the best known division of the ASC.  In 2011, Minister for Sport Mark Arbib announced the AIS would take responsibility for the strategic direction of high performance sport in Australia. In November 2012, the ASC released "Australia's Winning Edge 2012–2022", a high performance sport plan, which highlighted a new role for the AIS particularly in terms of developing coaches and talent identification but not directly managing national sports organisations elite athlete programs as it had done since 1981.

See also

 Australian Institute of Sport
 Australian Sports Commission Media Awards
 List of Australian Ministers for Sport

References

External links
 
Sports funding: federal balancing act - detailed summary of Australian Government funding and policies related to sport

 

Commonwealth Government agencies of Australia
1981 establishments in Australia
Sports organizations established in 1981